Black-and-white (B&W or B/W) images combine black and white in a continuous spectrum, producing a range of shades of grey.

Media 
The history of various visual media began with black and white, and as technology improved, altered to color.  However, there are exceptions to this rule, including black-and-white fine art photography, as well as many film motion pictures and art film(s).

Photography

Contemporary use 
Since the late 1960s, few mainstream films have been shot in black-and-white. The reasons are frequently commercial, as it is difficult to sell a film for television broadcasting if the film is not in color. 1961 was the last year in which the majority of Hollywood films were released in black and white.

Computing 
In computing terminology, black-and-white is sometimes used to refer to a binary image consisting solely of pure black pixels and pure white ones; what would normally be called a black-and-white image, that is, an image containing shades of gray, is referred to in this context as grayscale.

See also 
dr5 chrome
List of black-and-white films produced since 1966
Monochromatic color
Panchromatic film
Selective color

References 

Black-and-white media
Photographic processes